Vohemar (  or Iharan̈a ) is a coastal city and commune in northern Madagascar. It belongs to the district of Iharana, which is a part of Sava Region. The population of the commune was estimated to be approximately 15,000 in 2001 commune census.

In addition to primary schooling the town offers secondary education at both junior and senior levels. The town provides access to hospital services to its citizens.

From the late medieval period, Northern Madagascar had a number of small and large trading towns ruled by Swahili merchants. Vohemar, one such town, was likely founded around the 13th Century as a Swahili trading port.

Farming and raising livestock provides employment for 20% and 5% of the working population. The most important crop is cassava, while other important products are peanut, maize and rice. Industry and services provide employment for 20% and 45% of the population, respectively. Additionally fishing employs 10% of the population.

Infrastructures
There is a seaport and a local airport.

Vohemar is situated at the Route National 5a that connects the city with Ambilobe and Sambava/Antalaha.

Sports
 FC Jaolahin'Iharana - regional football champion (Sava) 2018.
 FC Iharana - regional football champion (Sava) 2019.

Personalities
Jean Omer Beriziky, prime minister of Madagascar, 2011-2014.

References

External links

Cities in Madagascar
Populated places in Sava Region